Jungangno Station is a station of Daejeon Metro Line 1 in Eunhang-dong, Jung District, Daejeon, South Korea.

This structure is the same as that of the metropolitan area train line 1 in Lee Moon-dong, Dongdaemun-gu, Seoul. In other words, it is the same as that of the island-style platform. As a result, it looks like a mixed type, but it is a two-sided two-wire type. Platform safety screen doors have been installed. It is located between Daejeon Station and Jung-gu Office Station of Daejeon Urban Railway Line 1. It is connected with Daejeon station which is a train station, and there are many passengers with convenient transportation.

Surroundings 
In the vicinity of the station there are 'NC department store Daejeon central road station', 'Hanbat general sports ground' and 'Chungmu gymnasium'. There are many shops and residential areas in the surrounding area, and there is a reverse market nearby.

References

External links
  Jungangno Station from Daejeon Metropolitan Express Transit Corporation

Daejeon Metro stations
Jung District, Daejeon
Railway stations opened in 2006
2006 establishments in South Korea